The Duggan House, officially the J. J. Duggan Residence, is a brick building in Edmonton, Alberta, that is a both a Provincial Historic Resource and a Municipal Historic Resource. It was listed on the Canadian Register of Historic Places in 2008. The house was built for John Joseph Duggan, an Edmonton politician and businessman, in 1907. Duggan lived there with his family for 25 years, and then the house was sold to the city and slated for demolition.

Since the early 1980s it has been home to the Alberta Association of Architects, who purchased and restored it as part of an anniversary initiative. It was further restored by David Murray Architects in 2013.

References

Historic buildings and structures in Canada